Saint Onuphrius is a tempera painting created by Emmanuel Tzanes.  Tzanes is one of the most important Greek painters of the 17th century.  He was active in Crete, Corfu, and Venice, Italy.  Both of his brothers were painters.  He has a massive art catalog attributed to him.  According to the Hellenic Institute over one hundred thirty of his works survived.  He belongs to the Late Cretan School and Heptanese School of painting.  He was part of the movement that introduced Flemish Engravings into the Greek world.
  
Saint Onuphrius lived in seclusion in the desert of Upper Egypt.  He was from Ethiopia.  The name Onuphrius is a Hellenized version of the Coptic name Unnufer from the Egyptian word wnn-nfr meaning the perfect one.  He was a monk near Thebes.  He studied law and philosophy before becoming a monk.  He eventually left the monastery and lived in the desert for over sixty years.  The only visitor he had to his monastic cell was an angel who delivered sacred bread every night. He also ate dates from desert palm trees. During his final days on earth, he was visited by a man named Paphnutius.  

When Paphnutius first saw him he was a scary wild figure covered with hair and wearing a loincloth of leaves.  He frightened Paphnutius.  He ran away from the scary homeless-looking man. The figure cried out: “Come down to me, man of God, for I am a man also, dwelling in the desert for the love of God.”  Paphnutius followed the wild-looking half-naked man.  He told him that he was a hermit living in isolation for over seventy years for God.  He endured extreme discomforts such as hunger and thirst.  An angel brought him to this place.  Paphnutius stayed with him for the night.  Bread and water miraculously appeared outside of the hermit's cell.  Paphnutius recorded the story and his story.  Onuphrius became a saint.  He is venerated as Saint Onuphrius.

Countless artists have depicted the subject matter namely Greek, Spanish and Italian painters.  An early depiction of the monk can be found in the Greek Monastery of Varlaam.  Notable works were completed there by Frangos Katelanos.  Different versions were also completed by Francisco Collantes and his contemporary Jusepe de Ribera.  
Another exceptional depiction similar to Tzane’s work was Lorenzo Lotto’s masterpiece.  
Onuphrius is typically depicted with wild hair, in a leafy  perizoma or loincloth as depicted in his story.   The masterpiece is part of the collection of Rena Andreadis in Athens Greece.  The collection is frequently exhibited at the Benaki Museum.

Description

The work is composed of egg tempera paint, gold leaf, and wood panel.  The height of the work is 31.5 cm (12.4 in.) and the width of the work is 25 cm (9.8 in.).  It features a thickness of 1.7 cm (.7 in.).  In 1662, two years after Tzanes became the priest at San Giorgio dei Greci in Venice he completed the masterpiece.  It is considered one of the painter's mature works.  The work is an emblem of the evolution of the Cretan School and reflective of the mannerisms of the Heptanese School.  Artists of the Ionian Islands began to humanize their figures.  They paid attention to the human anatomy.  Their painting style reflected the physical human form.  Onuphrius is covered in finely painted grey and white hair.  His long hair is knee-length.  Long hair lines are clearly visible.  His facial expression and pose are humble and unpretentious.  He holds a wooden cane.  The painter reflects the humanistic side of the heavenly saint. 

His ribs are clearly visible reflecting the true nature of   Onuphriu’s lifestyle. His face arms and legs feature humanistic elderly wrinkles.  The painter clearly demonstrates the figure's knees and elbows.  Tzanes also adds a magnificent palm tree growing out of the mountain.  A beautiful waterfall is also flowing from the mountain into a stream. It appears to our right in the lower portion of the painting.  This is the place Onuphrius ate and drank.  To our left, the painter adds a magnificent landscape establishing a foreground, a middle ground, and a background.  The painting is three-dimensional.  A cave appears to our left with an opening.  The artist clearly defines his monastic cell.  It is in the middle ground behind a tree.  Three mountains appear in the background.  A dove is also present signifying the Holy Spirit.   

The icon is full of Greek inscriptions.  The top features the term.  Ὁ ἉΓΙΟC ΟΝΟΥΦΡΙΟΣ — HO HAGIOS ONOUPHRIOS  [The] Holy Onuphrius.   Onuphrius is also featured holding a scroll with the Greek inscription:  ΟΣΤΙΣ ΔΩΡΟ[Ν] ΦΕΡΕΙ ΕΙΣ ΤΗΝ ΕΜΗΝ ΑΝΑΜΝΗΣΙΝ ΚΑΜΕ ΕΥΡΗΣΕΙ ΠΡΟΣ Τ[ΟΝ] ΘΕΟΝ ΠΡΟΣ- ΤΑΤΗΝ OSTIS DORON PHEREI EIS TEN EMEN ANAMNESIN KAME EURISEI PROS TON THEON PROSTATEN (Who a gift brings in my memory, will find me a protector/patron before God).  The artist also signed his work: ΧΕΙΡ ΕΜΜΑΝΟΥΗΛ ἹΕΡΕΩC ΤΖΑΝΕ ΤΟΥ ΕΚ ΡΗΘΗΜΝΗC CHEIR EMMANOUEL HIEREOS TZANE TOU EK RETHEMNES “[the] hand of Emmanuel Priest Tzane[s] the-one from Rethymnon” The date given is 1662.

Gallery

References

Bibliography 

17th-century paintings
Paintings in Greece
Paintings of the Heptanese School
Paintings by Emmanuel Tzanes